Isoetes lacustris, the lake quillwort or Merlin's grass, is a boreal quillwort native on both sides of the northern Atlantic Ocean. Synonyms include Isoetes hieroglyphica.

Description
The lake quillwort has many long, narrow leaves from 8–20 cm long and 0.5–2 mm broad, widening to 5 mm broad at the base. There is a sac that produces the spores at the bottom of each leaf base. The plant has a very short stem, called a corm, where all the leaves and roots are attached close together. It does not have traditional roots, but instead some of its leaves are modified to act like roots.  These pseudo-roots are called rhizomorphs, and are attached to the bottom end of corm. The upper leaves are green and found sprouting in a clump.

Reproduction usually takes place during the late summer or early fall. The sacs at the bottom of leaves create two types of spores, female (megaspores, about 0.5 mm diameter) and male (microspores, a few micrometres in diameter). These spores represent the gametophyte phase of the life cycle.

Taxonomy
Isoetes lacustris was discovered by Johannes Reinke, and first described by Carl Linnaeus. Isoetes hieroglyphica was considered to be a separate species, but is now considered to be a synonym of I. lacustris.

Distribution and habitat
In Europe, it is distributed from Poland west to northeastern France, throughout Scandinavia, the west and north of the British Isles, the Faroe Islands and Iceland. Further south, isolated populations occur in the glacial lakes of the Pirin mountain range in Bulgaria. In the North America, it occurs in the New England states of Maine, Vermont, New Hampshire Rhode Island and Massachusetts, and in Canada in provinces of New Brunswick and Nova Scotia.

It is found on the stony or sandy bottoms of clear, usually slightly acidic ponds, typically in mountain tarns, growing at 5–460 cm depth of water. They are perennial, with typically two flushes of new leaves each year, in spring and autumn.

Uses
This species is one of a few cultivated species of quillworts, either as an aquarium plant or as an educational resource.

References

External links
Flora Europaea: Isoetes lacustris
NCRS: USDA Plants Profile and map: Isoetes lacustris

lacustris
Flora of the Northeastern United States
Flora of Tennessee
Flora of Virginia
Flora of Saint Pierre and Miquelon
Flora of the Great Lakes region (North America)
Flora of Greenland
Flora of Eastern Canada
Flora of the Northwest Territories
Flora of Manitoba
Flora of Saskatchewan